Children's Medical Center Dallas is a nationally ranked pediatric acute care teaching hospital located in Dallas, Texas, USA. The hospital has 496 pediatric beds and is affiliated with the University of Texas Southwestern Medical School. It provides comprehensive pediatric specialties and subspecialties to infants, children, teens and young adults aged 0–21 throughout Texas and surrounding regions. It sometimes treats adults who require pediatric care as well. It has an ACS designated level 1 pediatric trauma center, one of five in Texas. The hospital also has affiliations with the adjacent Parkland Memorial Hospital.

Children's Medical Center Dallas is the main hospital campus of Children's Health, the only academic healthcare system in Dallas-Fort Worth dedicated solely to the comprehensive care of children from birth to age 21. Children's Health started with just the Dallas location, but has grown to include Children's Medical Center Plano as well as several other pediatric specialty, primary care and urgent care centers located throughout North Texas. It is one of the largest pediatric hospitals in the US.

History
Children's Medical Center Dallas traces its origins to summer 1913, when a group of nurses organized an open-air clinic on the lawn of the old Parkland Hospital in Dallas. The original clinic was known as the Dallas Baby Camp and treated infants up to age 3.

The nurses recognized that children received better care when it was focused only on them. In 1930, the Dallas Baby Camp grew into the Bradford Hospital for Babies, which merged with Children's Hospital of Texas and Richmond Freeman Memorial Clinic in 1948 to form what is now known as Children's Medical Center of Dallas.

It affiliated with UT Southwestern Medical Center in 1964.

In 1967, administrative structures strengthened and the new campus was opened at its current location.

In 2014, it expanded into Children's Health, a system dedicated to providing all types of care for children, as well as public education about health and wellness, across its several hospitals, specialty centers and pediatric clinics throughout North Texas.

About

Location and features
Located at 1935 Medical District Drive in the heart of Dallas, the hospital is licensed for 490 beds and recorded more than 460,000 patient encounters in 2018. It has 16 large, technologically advanced operating rooms, a 47-bed level 4 neonatal intensive care unit and offers expertise in more than 50 pediatric specialties and the highest level of trauma care in North Texas as a pediatric level I trauma center.

Rankings and recognition
Named in U.S. News & World Report's list of the top pediatric hospitals in the US in the 2018-2019 "Best Children's Hospitals" survey, in all ten specialties.

References

External links 

 Official website

Children's hospitals in the United States
Hospitals in Dallas
Teaching hospitals in Texas
University of Texas System
Hospitals established in 1913
1913 establishments in Texas
Southwestern Medical District
Hospital buildings completed in 2004
Hospital buildings completed in 2009
Pediatric trauma centers
Children's hospitals in Texas